Songs About Stuff is the first studio album by Singer/Songwriter Wally Pleasant, which he released in 1992 on Miranda Records.

Track listing
"Small Time Drug Dealer"
"Bad Haircut"
"That's Evolution"
"Ode to Detroit"
"First Love"
"Love in my world"
"Lost Weekend Las Vegas"
"She's in Love with a Geek"
"Cool Guy with a Car"
"Psycho Roommate"
"Hippies Lament"
"(I Wanna Be A) Pop Star"
"If I Were"
"Restless College Years"
"Dead Rock 'n Roll Stars"

1992 debut albums
Wally Pleasant albums